On April 9, 2003, during the US invasion of Iraq, a large statue of Saddam Hussein in Baghdad's Firdos Square was destroyed by Iraqi civilians and United States Marines. The event received global media coverage, wherein it came to symbolize the end of Hussein's rule in Iraq.

US government officials and journalists, citing footage of jubilant Iraqis jumping on and sledgehammering the statue, claimed the event symbolized a victory for the United States, but this narrative was undermined by the development of an Iraqi insurgency. A retrospective analysis by ProPublica and The New Yorker concluded that the media had exaggerated both the size and enthusiasm of the crowd, had influenced the crowd's behavior, and subsequently had turned the event into "a visual echo chamber" that promoted an unrealistically positive account of the invasion at the expense of more important news stories.

Significance
In April 2002, the  statue was erected in honor of the birthday of Saddam Hussein.

In the afternoon of April 9, 2003, a group of Iraqi civilians began to attack the statue. One such futile attempt by sledgehammer-wielding weightlifter Kadhem Sharif Al-Jabbouri particularly caught media attention. Shortly after, an advance unit of the United States Marine Corps from the 3rd Battalion, 4th Marines arrived at Firdos Square, secured the area and made contact with the foreign journalists who had been quartered in the Palestine Hotel at the square. After a couple of hours, the US Marines toppled the statue with a M88 armored recovery vehicle.

According to the book Shooter, the first plan was to attach a cable between the M88 and the statue's torso area. Someone pointed out that if the cable snapped, it might whiplash and kill people. The alternate method chosen was to wrap a chain around the neck. Eventually, the M88 was able to topple the statue which was jumped and stomped upon by Iraqi citizens who then decapitated the statue and dragged it through the streets of the city hitting it with their shoes. The destruction of the statue was shown live on cable news networks as it happened and made the front pages of newspapers and covers of magazines throughout the world – symbolizing the fall of  Hussein's government. The images of the statue destruction provided a clear refutation of Information Minister Muhammad Saeed al-Sahhaf's reports that Iraq had been winning the war.

A green sculpture by Bassem Hamad al-Dawiri, meant to symbolize the unity of Iraq, was installed on the empty plinth in June 2003 and remained there until it was removed and demolished in 2013.

Flags
Before the statue was toppled, Marine Corporal Edward Chin of 1st Tank Battalion, 1st Marine Division (attached to 3rd Battalion 4th Marines) climbed the ladder and placed a U.S. flag over the statue's face. According to the book "Shooter", by Coughlin, Kuhlman, and Davis, other Marines of the 3/4 realized the PR disaster unfolding as the formerly cheering crowd became silent, with one woman shouting at the Marines to remove the flag. Kuhlman had appropriated an Iraqi flag as a war trophy during a raid earlier in the war, and quickly unfurled it and headed for the statue. The crowd grabbed this flag and then placed it over the statue.

Conflicting reports
The event was widely publicized, but allegations that it had been staged were soon published. One picture from the event, published in the Evening Standard, was digitally altered to suggest a larger crowd.  A report by the Los Angeles Times stated it was an unnamed Marine colonel, not Iraqi civilians who had decided to topple the statue; and that a quick-thinking Army psychological operations team then used loudspeakers to encourage Iraqi civilians to assist and made it all appear spontaneous and Iraqi-inspired. According to Tim Brown at Globalsecurity.org: "It was not completely stage-managed from Washington, DC but it was not exactly a spontaneous Iraqi operation."

The Marines present at the time, 3rd Battalion 4th Marines as well as 1st Tank Battalion, maintain that the scene was not staged other than the assistance they provided.

Robert Fisk described the event as "the most staged photo opportunity since Iwo Jima."

Legacy
The toppling of Saddam's statue has been compared to an earlier incident during the Hungarian Revolution of 1956, when a statue of Stalin was "decapitated" and ultimately torn down to its "boots".

Kadhim Sharif Hassan Al-Jabbouri said in 2016 that he regretted his part in the destruction of the statue and wants it replaced. Al-Jabbouri used to repair the motorcycles of deposed Iraqi President Saddam Hussein before falling out of favor and being jailed for a year and a half and says that 14–15 members of his family were killed by the Ba'athist regime. When the Americans reached the outskirts of Baghdad, he got a sledgehammer to aid in toppling the statue. After the Americans arrived in the square, they put an American flag over the face of the statue, but Al-Jabbouri "couldn't accept this" and insisted they used an Iraqi flag, which he gave them.

Al-Jabbouri said that after the invasion, "[things] started to get worse every year. There was infighting, corruption, killing, looting. Saddam has gone, but now in his place, we have 1,000 Saddams. I feel like Iraq has been stolen from us. Bush and Blair are definitely liars. They destroyed Iraq and took us back to zero and took us back to the Middle Ages or earlier. If I was a criminal I would kill them with my bare hands."

Al-Jabbouri subsequently said "when I go past that statue, I feel pain and shame. I ask myself, "Why did I topple this statue?". I'd like to put it back up, to rebuild it. I'd put it back up but I'm afraid I would be killed."

See also
Nick Popaditch

References

Further reading

Iraq War
Buildings and structures in Baghdad
2000s in Baghdad
Demolished buildings and structures in Iraq
Destroyed sculptures
Iconoclasm
Monuments and memorials in Iraq
Photography in Iraq
Sculptures of men
Statues of presidents
Statues in Iraq
Removed statues
Vandalized works of art
George W. Bush administration controversies